Dangerous Tata is a 2005 studio album by Tata Young. It marks a return to her performing Thai pop after her debut English-language album, I Believe, in 2004. It also signaled a new direction for her, recording with the Thai rap music group Thaitanium and the R&B boyband, B5, however this new style seemed only but a phase in the singer's career, being that her styled changed once more in her following album: "Temperature Rising"

Track listing
Only Two Of Us (Song Kon Nueng Kuen, Bonus Track)
I Believe (Thai Version) (Bonus Track)
Dangerous (featuring Thaitanium)  
Shining (featuring Nop Ponchamni)  
Completely  
Love Without A Cause  
I'll Be Your Girl  
Give It Back To Me  
Love Song In The Wind  (featuring Tor+)
In The Mood (featuring Prem. B)
Hey Ma Ma Say  
Calling Inside (featuring B5)

References

External links
Tata2You Discography

2005 albums
Tata Young albums